Steven Ungerleider (1949 – March 18, 2023) was an American sports psychologist, author, and documentary film producer.

Biography
Ungerleider was born to a Jewish family, the son of Joy (née Gottesman) and Samuel Ungerleider. His grandfather was D. Samuel Gottesman. He was a graduate of the University of Texas at Austin.  He held a  PhD from the University of Oregon.  As an undergraduate, he competed in gymnastics for the University of Texas.

Ungerleider's first documentary film, Munich '72 and Beyond, was released in 2016.

He has two daughters: physician and film producer, Shoshana R. Ungerleider; and attorney Ariel Ungerleider Kelley.

Ungerleider died in Healdsburg, California on March 18, 2023, at the age of 73.

Films 
 2016 - Munich '72 and Beyond - Producer
 2018 - End Game - Executive Producer
 2018 - At the Heart of Gold: Inside the USA Gymnastics Scandal – Producer
2020 - Positive All the Way - Director and Producer
2021 - Citizen Ashe - Executive Producer
2021 - Waterman - Producer

Books
 Quest For Success (WRS/Spence Publications, 1994)
 Mental Training For Peak Performance (Rodale Press, 1996) 
 Faust's Gold: Inside the East German Doping Machine (St.Martin's Press)
 Beyond Strength (McGraw-Hill, 1991) with co-author Dr. Jacqueline Golding

References

External links
  Munich Memorial Project Interview with Dr. Steven Ungerleider
 

1949 births
2023 deaths
21st-century American psychologists
20th-century American Jews
Sports psychologists
University of Oregon alumni
University of Texas at Austin alumni
Place of birth missing (living people)
American documentary filmmakers
Gottesman family
21st-century American Jews
20th-century American psychologists